Brigadier Hendrik Jacobus Greyvenstein (11 July 1916 – 15 March 1986) was a senior officer in the South African Army from the artillery. He was educated at University of Pretoria and took part in the Second World War as an artilleryman. He was seconded to the Royal Artillery in 1944 and served as Adjutant at the Artillery School, officer instructor and Battery Commander 10 Field Battery, 4  Field Regiment.

Military career 
Greyvenstein graduated from the British Overseas School in Egypt during the Second World War and completed the SA Military College Staff course. He served as Chief Instructor Gunnery during the fifties, Battery Commander at 1 South African Infantry Battalion in Oudtshoorn. He commanded 4 Field Regiment and the School of Artillery. before being appointed as the Director of Artillery. Brigadier Greyvenstein served at General Headquarters, Chief of Staff section before he retired in the mid seventies.

Greyvenstein died in Pretoria on 15 March 1986, at the age of 69.

Awards and decorations

References 

1916 births
1986 deaths
South African Army generals
South African military officers
South African military personnel of World War II
Afrikaner people
South African people of Dutch descent